Derek Lewis (born 9 July 1946) is a former Director General of HM Prison Service, who was sacked in 1995 by then Home Secretary Michael Howard after a series of high-profile escapes by IRA prisoners. He had declined to suspend the governor of Parkhurst Prison after a mass escape, and alleged that Howard had threatened to overrule him to force the suspension. Howard denied that he had done so. During the 1997 Conservative Leadership contest, Jeremy Paxman asked Howard whether he had threatened to overrule Lewis. The question was put 12 times with Howard failing to give a definitive answer.

Lewis studied at Queens' College, Cambridge between 1964 and 1967 where he was a member of the Cherubs dining society.

References

1946 births
Alumni of Queens' College, Cambridge
Living people
British prison governors